Shabaash India is a reality show that aired on Zee TV that showcased the record-breaking and unorthodox talents of the people of India. The shows presented different abilities of people such as physical strength, stamina, mental and paranormal that amazed TV viewers. Notable feats in the shows have been a man pulling a Boeing 737 with his hair, a lady passing 50 motor cycles over her stomach and a young man breaking 76 tube lights with his neck. The show is hosted by Hussain Kuwajerwala.

See also 

 OMG! Yeh Mera India 
 Mano Ya Na Mano (2006 TV series) 
 Mano Ya Na Mano (1995 TV series)

References

Zee TV original programming
2006 Indian television series debuts
2008 Indian television series endings